Chester F. Phelps Wildlife Management Area (also known as the C.F. Phelps Wildlife Management Area) is a  Wildlife Management Area located in Fauquier and Culpeper counties, Virginia. Most of the terrain is rolling, low, and shallow; the steepest land can be seen near the Rappahannock River, which forms a large part of the property's western border. A number of small streams cross the land, and a  pond is located near its center. The forests on the property contain both pine and hardwood.

The area allows seasonal hunting for deer, turkey, small game, and waterfowl. A shooting range for sighting-in rifles is available. Fishing includes opportunities for bluegill, sunfish, carp, bass, and channel catfish in Phelps Pond; the Rappahannock River at Kelly's Ford contains smallmouth bass, largemouth bass, rock bass, sunfish, carp, channel catfish, and suckers. A canoe/kayak boat ramp is available at Kelly's Ford. Other permissible activities include fishing, hiking, horseback riding, boating, and primitive camping. 

Chester F. Phelps Wildlife Management Area is owned and maintained by the Virginia Department of Game and Inland Fisheries. Access for persons 17 years of age or older requires a valid hunting or fishing permit, or a WMA access permit.

See also
 List of Virginia Wildlife Management Areas

References

External links
Virginia Department of Game and Inland Fisheries: Chester F. Phelps Wildlife Management Area

Wildlife management areas of Virginia
Protected areas of Fauquier County, Virginia
Protected areas of Culpeper County, Virginia